Archfell Musango is a Zambian Olympic middle-distance runner. He represented his country in the men's 1500 meters and the men's 800 meters at the 1984 Summer Olympics, as well as the men's 800 metres, men's 1500 metres, and men's 4 x 400 metres relay at the 1980 Summer Olympics.

References 

1959 births
Living people
Zambian male middle-distance runners
Olympic athletes of Zambia
Athletes (track and field) at the 1980 Summer Olympics
Athletes (track and field) at the 1984 Summer Olympics